In enzymology, a D-xylulose reductase is an enzyme that catalyzes the chemical reaction

xylitol + NAD+  D-xylulose + NADH + H+

Thus, the two substrates of this enzyme are xylitol and NAD+, whereas its 3 products are D-xylulose, NADH, and H+.

This enzyme belongs to the family of oxidoreductases, specifically those acting on the CH-OH group of donor with NAD+ or NADP+ as acceptor. The systematic name of this enzyme class is xylitol:NAD+ 2-oxidoreductase (D-xylulose-forming). Other names in common use include NAD+-dependent xylitol dehydrogenase, xylitol dehydrogenase, erythritol dehydrogenase, 2,3-cis-polyol(DPN) dehydrogenase (C3-5), pentitol-DPN dehydrogenase, and xylitol-2-dehydrogenase. This enzyme participates in pentose and glucuronate interconversions.

Structural studies

As of late 2007, only one structure has been solved for this class of enzymes, with the PDB accession code .

References

 
 
 

EC 1.1.1
NADH-dependent enzymes
Enzymes of known structure